The Carleton Lady Ravens women's ice hockey program represents Carleton University in Ottawa, Ontario, Canada.

Preseason

Carleton Ravens invitational tournament

Regular season
In her first two games back from injury, forward Claudia Bergeron helped the Lady Ravens remain undefeated in regulation. On October 22, Bergeron assisted on the Lady Ravens third goal of the game in a 4-3 shootout loss to the cross-town Ottawa Gee-Gees. In the October 23 4-2 victory over Concordia, she notched two goals (including one on the first shot of the game) before the midway point of the first period.
October 30: Despite outshooting the Martlets 49-21, the Ravens were bested by a 3-0 tally. The game was scoreless through two periods, although Ravens skater Claudia Bergeron beat Martlets goaltender Charline Labonte with a shot in the second period. The shot hit the crossbar, but the Martlets registered a trio of goals (including an empty net goal) to win the match. Ann-Sophie Bettez scored the game-winning goal and was recognized as the player of the game for the Martlets, while Ravens goaltender Tamber Tisdale was player of the game for the Ravens.
From November 25 to November 26, 2011, Tamber Tisdale did not allow any even strength goals. In a contest versus the Montreal Carabins, Tisdale made 40 saves in a 6-5 victory. The following day, she stopped 34 shots as she earned her first shutout of the season, in a 3-0 blanking of the Concordia Stingers. After the win, she was the QSSF leader with a save percentage of .930.
On January 22, 2012, Tisdale helped the Ravens to their first ever victory over the McGill Martlets. The number one ranked Martlets were stunned by a 4-3 mark in a shootout. She made 32 of 35 saves in regulation time while stopping five of six Martlets in the shootout.
February 4: In a tribute to the late Daron Richardson, daughter of Ottawa Senators assistant coach, Luke Richardson, the Ravens were on the winning end of a 5-4 shootout win against the Concordia Stingers. The club held a charity drive for the Daron Richardson Fund (known as Do It For Daron), a program focused on raising awareness about youth mental health. Bruce MacDonald, Daron's former coach and the father of Ravens player Kristen MacDonald participated in the ceremonial face off.

The win helped the Ravens clinch a playoff berth as they posted a 6-6-3 record. The lead changed multiple times during the match. Mallory Lawton and Danielle Scarlett contributed to an early 2-0 Stingers lead. Kristen MacDonald and Melanie McKnight tied the game until Catherine Rancourt gave Concordia the lead.

Claudia Bergeron tied the game, but Concordia would break the tie in the third period. Meghan George would notch her first tally of the season. Team captain Sara Seiler netted a goal on own rebound forcing overtime. Tamber Tisdale made 42 saves in the game, as the Ravens claimed victory in the shootout.

February 5: Kelsey Vander Veen notched a hat trick (all goals were scored in the second period) as the Ravens fought back from a three-goal deficit versus the Montreal Carabins. The Ravens would go on to win the match by a 6-5 mark in a shootout. Vander Veen scored her first goal 30 seconds after Carleton found themselves down by a 4-1 mark. With less than a minute to go in the second period, she completed the natural hat trick.

Schedule

Current roster

Awards and honors
Claudia Bergeron, Carleton University Female Athlete of the Week (Week of October 24, 2011)
Tamber Tisdale, Carleton University Female Athlete of the Week (Week ending November 27, 2011)
Tamber Tisdale, Carleton University Female Athlete of the Week (Week ending January 22, 2012)
 Kelsey Vander Veen, Carleton University Female Athlete of the Week (Week ending February 5, 2012)

References

See also
 Carleton Lady Ravens ice hockey
 2010–11 Carleton Lady Ravens ice hockey season
 Ainslee Kent 2011 - 2012 Carleton Top Rookie Award

External links 
 The official site of Carleton women’s hockey 

Carleton Ravens
Carleton
Carl